Elias Khoury (born 12 July 1948) is a Lebanese novelist and public intellectual. His novels and literary criticism have been translated into several languages. In 2000, he won the Prize of Palestine for his book Gate of the Sun, and he won the Al Owais Award for fiction writing in 2007. Khoury has also written three plays and two screenplays.

From 1993 to 2009, Khoury served as an editor of Al-Mulhaq, the weekly cultural supplement of the Lebanese daily newspaper Al-Nahar. He also taught at universities in Middle Eastern and European countries, and the United States.

Biography

Early life 
Elias Khoury was born in 1948 into a middle-class Greek Orthodox family in the predominantly Christian Ashrafiyye district of Beirut.

He began reading Lebanese novelist Jurji Zaydan's works at the age of eight, which he later said taught him more about Islam and his Arabic background. Later, Khoury grew interested in classical Arabic literature, Russian novels by Pushkin and Chekhov, and modernist literature.

In 1966, he earned his high school diploma from al-Ra'i al-Saleh High School in Beirut. At the time he graduated, Lebanese intellectual life was becoming more polarized, with opposition groups adopting pro-Palestinian, radical Arab nationalist stances. The following year, in 1967, a 19-year-old Khoury traveled to Jordan, where he visited a Palestinian refugee camp and enlisted in Fatah, the argest resistance organization in the Palestinian Liberation Organisation. He left Jordan after thousands of Palestinians were killed or expelled in the wake of an attempted coup against King Hussein, in Black September. 

Khoury studied history at the Lebanese University and graduated in 1971. In 1972, he received his PhD in social history at the University of Paris.

Involvement in the Lebanese civil war 
At the start of the Lebanese civil war, Khoury became a member of the Lebanese National Movement, an alliance of leftist, pan-Arab parties with mostly Muslim supporters. He was injured during the war, and temporarily blinded.

Career

Literary career 

Khoury published his first novel in 1975, On the Relations of the Circle (Arabic: عن علاقات الدائرة). It was followed in 1977 by The Little Mountain (Arabic: الجبل الصغير), set during the Lebanese Civil War, a conflict that Khoury initially thought would be a catalyst for progressive change. Other works include The Journey of Little Gandhi, about a rural immigrant to Beirut who lives through the events of the civil war; and Gate of the Sun (2000), an epic re-telling of the life of Palestinian refugees in Lebanon since the 1948 Palestinian exodus. The book, which addresses the ideas of memory, truth, and storytelling, was adapted as a film of the same name by Egyptian director Yousry Nasrallah (2002).

In an interview by the Israeli newspaper Yediot Aharonot, after the publication of the Hebrew translation of Gate of the Sun, Khoury remarked:"When I was working on this book, I discovered that the "other" is the mirror of the I. And given that I am writing about half a century of Palestinian experience, it is impossible to read this experience otherwise than in the mirror of the Israeli "other." Therefore, when I was writing this novel, I put a lot of effort into trying to take apart not only the Palestinian stereotype but also the Israeli stereotype as it appears in Arab literature and especially in the Palestinian literature of Ghassan Kanafani, for example, or even of Emil Habibi. The Israeli is not only the policeman or the occupier, he is the "other," who also has a human experience, and we need to read this experience. Our reading of their experience is a mirror to our reading of the Palestinian experience."  

Khoury's novel Yalo (2002, translated into English in 2008 by American Peter Theroux) depicted a former militiaman accused of crimes during Lebanon's civil war. He described the use of torture in the Lebanese judicial system. The title refers to the name of a Palestinian Arab village that was annexed by Israel during the 1967 and later destroyed. All the inhabitants were expelled and most went to Jordan. Kirkus Reviews described the book as a "deceptively intricate" story and an "unsparing portrayal of a man without a country, a history or even an identity."

Khoury's novels are notable for their complex approach to political themes and fundamental questions of human behavior. His narrative technique often involves an interior monologue, at times approaching a stream of consciousness. In recent works he has tended to use a considerable element of colloquial Arabic, although the language of his novels remains primarily Modern Standard Arabic. While use of dialect in dialogue is relatively common in modern Arabic literature (for example, in the work of Yusuf Idris), Khoury also uses it in the main narrative, which is unusual in contemporary literature. Khoury has explained this choice by saying, "As long as the official, written language is not opened to the spoken language it is a total repression because it means that the spoken, social experience is marginalised."

In addition to his novels, Khoury has also served in several editorial positions, starting in 1972 when he joined the editorial board of the journal Mawaqif. From 1975 to 1979, Khoury was editor of Shu'un Filastinia (Palestinian Affairs Magazine), collaborating with Mahmoud Darwish. Between 1980 and 1985, Khoury worked as an editor of the series Thakirat Al-Shu'ub, published by the Arab Research Foundation in Beirut. In the 1980s he was the editorial director first of Al-Karmel Magazine, and then of the cultural section of Al-Safir. Khoury also worked as the technical director of Beirut Theater from 1992 to 1998, and was a co-director of the Ayloul Festival of Modern Arts.

In 1993, Khoury became the editor of Al-Mulhaq, the cultural supplement of the Lebanese daily newspaper Al-Nahar. Under his leadership, the magazine criticized controversial aspects of Lebanon's post-Civil War reconstruction, which was led by former Lebanese prime minister Rafic Hariri. In a 2019 article, Khaled Saghieh wrote that Al-Mulhaq was "foundational in launching the debate over memory that would occupy a wide portion of the Lebanese cultural scene in the 1990s."

Khoury's works have been translated and published in Catalan, Dutch, English, French, German, Hebrew, Italian, Portuguese, Norwegian, Spanish, and Swedish.

Academic career 
He has taught at many universities, including New York University, University of Houston, Berkeley College, The University of Chicago, Columbia University, Georgetown University, the University of Minnesota, and Princeton University in the United States. He also taught at the University of Poitiers in France, the University of London in the UK, the University of Berlin in Germany, and the University of Zurich in Switzerland. In his home country Lebanon, he taught at the American University of Beirut, the Lebanese American University, and his alma mater, the Lebanese University.

Personal life
Elias Khoury is married and has children.

Published works

Novels
 1975:  'an 'ilaqat al-da'irah (عن علاقات الدائرة)
 1977: al-Jabal al-saghir (الجبل الصغير); translated to English, French, and Swedish. English translation: Little Mountain (1989, Maia Tabet)
 1981: Abwab al-madinah (أبواب المدينة); English translation: The Gates of the City (1993, Paula Haydar)
 1981: Wujuh al-bayda (الوجوه البيضاء); translated to English and French. English translation: White Masks (2010, Maia Tabet)
 1989: Rihlat Ghandi al-saghir (رحلة غاندي الصغير); translated to French, English, and Italian. English translation: The Journey of Little Gandhi (1994, Paula Haydar)
1990: Akaa wl Rahil (عكا و الرحيل); which was issued in Beirut.
 1993: Mamlakat al-ghuraba (مملكة الغرباء); translated to English and German. English translation: The Kingdom of Strangers (1996, Paula Haydar)
 1994: Majma' al-Asrar (مجمع الأسرار); translated to German and Hebrew. Hebrew Translation. Hebrew Translation: "Pkaa't shel Sodout" (2017, Maktoob Book Series)
 1998: Bab al-Shams (باب الشمس); translated to French, Hebrew, German, English, Swedish, Norwegian, Italian, and Spanish. English translation: Gate of the Sun (2006, Humphrey Davies)
 2000: Ra'ihat al-Sabun (رائحة الصابون)
 2002: Yalu (يالو); translated to English and Dutch. English translations: Yalo (2008, Peter Theroux), (2009, Humphrey Davies: short-listed for Best Translated Book Award)
 2007: Ka-annaha na'imah (كأنها نائمة); English translations: As Though She Were Sleeping (2011, Humphrey Davies), (2012, Marilyn Booth), Prix du roman arabe in 2008 under the French title Comme si elle dormait.
 2012: al-Maryia al-maksoura (المرايا المكسورة: سينالكول) English translations: Broken Mirrors: Sinocal (2012, Humphrey Davis)
 2016: Awlad Al-Ghetto- Esme Adam (أولاد الغيتو- اسمي آدم); Hebrew translation: "Yalde Ha-getto: Shme Adam" (2018, Maktoob Book Series) ;English translation: My Name is Adam: Children of the Ghetto Volume 1 (2018, Humphrey Davies)
 2018: "Awlad Al-Ghetto 2: Najmat Elbaher" (أولاد الغيتو ٢: نجمة البحر); Hebrew translation: "Stella Maris" (2019, Maktoob Book Series).

Story groups
 (1984) "Al-mubtada' wa'l-khabar", issued in Beirut.
1990: Al-lo'aba al-hakikiya(اللعبة الحقيقية); issued in Beirut.

Criticism
 (1979) Dirasat fi naqd al-shi'r 
 (1982) Al-dhakira al-mafquda 
 (1984) Tajribat al-ba'th 'an ufq 
 (1985) Zaman al-ihtilal

Plays
1993: Muthakarat Ayoub
1995: Habs al-Ramel (in collaboration with Rabih Mrouè)
2000: Thalathat Mulsakat (in collaboration with Rabih Mroué)

Screenplays
1992: Kharej al-Hayat (in collaboration with Maroun Baghdadi)
2002: Bab al-Shams (in collaboration with Yousry Nasrallah and Mohamed Soueid)

References

Bibliography
 Archipelagobooks.org
 Archipelagobooks.org
 Kassir, Samir, Histoire de Beyrouth, Paris, Fayard.

External links
At Levantine Cultural Center.
Interview with Elias Khoury, from Lebanese Centre for Policy Studies website.
Review of Gate of the Sun, The New York Times.
Jeremy Harding goes to Beirut to meet the novelist Elias Khoury, London Review of Books.
Maya Jaggi, "A circle of madness", The Guardian, 28 July 2007.
on war, literature and hope, BBC Newshour, 25 July 2015
 Nakba’s Second Generation Illuminates Dark Corners for Holocaust’s Second Generation, Sara Carmeli Warzager review of the Hebrew version of "Children of the Ghetto- My name is Adam", Maktoob- The Translators forum from Arabic to Hebrew, 19 July 2018.
Elias Khoury, The Art of Fiction No. 233 Paris Review, Spring 2017

1948 births
Living people
Lebanese novelists
Arabic-language novelists
Writers from Beirut
Academic staff of the American University of Beirut
Academic staff of New York University Abu Dhabi
Columbia University faculty
Academic staff of Lebanese American University
Eastern Orthodox Christians from Lebanon
Lebanese socialists
Academic staff of Lebanese University
University of Paris alumni